Läkartidningen is a Swedish medical journal which was first published in 1965 by the Sveriges Läkarförbund (Swedish Medical Association), an organisation founded in 1904.

External links
  (in Swedish)
Lakartidningen Publication information at the National Library of Medicine website

Publications established in 1965
Swedish-language journals
General medical journals
Academic journals published by learned and professional societies
Medicine in Sweden